Mario Mendoza Zambrano (born January 06 1964) is a Colombian writer, professor, and journalist.

Biography 
Mario Mendoza Zambrano was born in 1964 in Bogotá, Colombia. He studied at Colegio Refous and Pontificia Universidad Javeriana in Bogotá, where he earned an MA in Latin American Literature. Later, he was Professor of Literature at the same university where he studied. He went to Toledo to attend courses of Spanish American literature, and also went to Israel where he lived in Hof Ashkelon. It was after this trip, upon returning home, that his work began to be published in Colombian magazines and newspapers. During fall of 1997, he worked at James Madison University in Virginia, US.

After graduation in 1980, Mendoza commenced his literary career by combining writing with teaching and collaborating with various cultural print media, such as Journal Bacánika and El Tiempo Newspaper. He has taught literature for over ten years.

Thanks to his novel Satanás, Mendoza won the Seix Barral Premio Biblioteca Breve in 2002. He is one of the most renowned Latin American writers today.

About his work 
Through the images described in several of his texts, Mendoza recreates Bogotá, a city that hardly anyone has dared to sketch. This is firstly introduced in La Ciudad de los Umbrales, published in 1992. In this novel he starts to show the image of Bogotá as the "transvestite city". A concept he only thoroughly explained later on, at a discussion held at the Luis Angel Arango Library in May 2004.

Now, the city that reveals Mario Mendoza in the triptych [Scorpio City (1998), El Relato de un Asesino (2001) and Satanás (2002)] is a dark muse whose beauty is dark because it condenses the infernal and the sacred, the criminal and the virtuous, the disgusting and the desirable, the painful and the pleasant. A late-century metropolis, which has the strange case of Harry Jekyll and Edward Hyde, as she has multiplicity of overlapping facets in constant tension; she is a seductive monster whose essence is not possible to determine. Whether she came "deep down from heaven or emerged from the abyss."

"Through agile and concise prose, Mendoza achieves a milestone in his own narrative universe; a universe in which it is possible to find beauty in the ugly and disgusting, without trying to cover it up with facile catharsis. Since writing proposes a hyper visceral aesthetic, which fears do not travel intricate regions of the human psyche, or skirting the limits of madness."

Mendoza lives taking the pulse of the city. He has been a literary spokesman for the city of Bogotá for over 20 years. In his novels, it can can be traced neighborhoods, bridges, schools, streets, universities, parks and the changes that the Colombian Capital has been experiencing during these decades. Thus, this Bogota author noted for his interest in creating resistance, not with a guild of fans of his literary work but apparently by forming activist fighters like him, through their writings. Thus, literature, as resistance to the injustices of the system, accounts for that social reality and openly expose them to society. Eventually the work of Mendoza is on track to be recognized as a valuable work related to the Colombian urban literature, especially in regard to the representation of the city of Bogotá in Colombian writings.

Works

Novel 
 La ciudad de los umbrales (1994)
 Scorpio City (1998)
 Relato de un asesino (2001)  
 Satanás (2002)
 El viaje del loco Tafur (2003)
 Cobro de sangre (2004)
 Los hombres invisibles (2007)
 Buda Blues (2009)
 Apocalipsis (2011)
 Lady Masacre (2013)
  La melancolía de los feos (2016)
  Diario del fin del mundo (2018)
  Akelarre (2019)

Story 
 La travesía del vidente (1997)
 Una escalera al cielo (2004)
 La locura de nuestro tiempo (2010)
 La importancia de morir a tiempo (2012)

Junior Novel 
 Mi extraño viaje al mundo de Shambala (2013)
 La colonia de Altair (2013)
 Crononautas (2013)
 Metempsicosis (2014)
 El hijo del carpintero (2014)

Comic and Graphic Novels 
 2018 Satanás
 2019 El Último Día Sobre la Tierra - Volumen 1: Imágenes Premonitorias
 2019 El Último Día Sobre la Tierra - Volumen 2: Están entre Nosotros
 2020 El Último Día Sobre la Tierra - Volumen 3: El Astrólogo
 2020 El Último Día Sobre la Tierra - Volumen 4: Los Híbridos

Awards 
 Premio Nacional de Literatura del Instituto Distrital de Cultura y Turismo de Bogotá (1995)
 Premio Biblioteca Breve from Seix Barral for the novel Satanás (2002)
 Premio Nacional de Literatura Libros y Letras (2011)

References

External links 

 Entrevista: Mario Mendoza: Historias del Bogotá profundo
 Novela negra:Entrevista a Mario Mendoza
 Entrevista a MM por Álvaro A. Bernal
 El espejo de la crítica: Mario Mendoza y Satanás
 Entrevista: La locura que vive Mario Mendoza
 Apocalipsis, el rompecabezas de dos décadas
 Confesiones de MM en "la locura de nuestro tiempo"

20th-century Colombian novelists
21st-century Colombian novelists
Colombian male novelists
Colombian male short story writers
Colombian short story writers
1964 births
Living people
20th-century short story writers
21st-century short story writers
20th-century male writers
21st-century male writers